{{DISPLAYTITLE:C15H23N}}
The molecular formula C15H23N (molar mass: 217.35 g/mol, exact mass: 217.1830 u) may refer to:

 PCPr
 Prolintane

Molecular formulas